Edo Murtić (4 May 1921 – 2 January 2005) was a painter from Croatia, best known for his lyrical abstraction and abstract expressionism style. He worked in a variety of media, including oil painting, gouache, graphic design, ceramics, mosaics, murals and theatrical set design. Murtić travelled and exhibited extensively in Europe and North America, gaining international recognition for his work, which can be found in museums, galleries and private collections worldwide. He was one of the founders of the group "March" (Mart) in 1956, and received many international awards. In 1958 Murtić participated in the three biggest events in the world of contemporary art: the Venice Biennale, the Carnegie Prize in Pittsburgh, and Documenta in Kassel. Interest in the art of Edo Murtić continues to grow, with retrospective exhibits in major museums.

Murtić was a member of the Croatian Academy of Sciences and Arts, and a member of the Croatian Helsinki Committee for Human Rights.

Biography
Murtić was born on 4 May 1921 in Velika Pisanica near Bjelovar, Croatia (then in Kingdom of Serbs, Croats and Slovenes). He was the second child of Vinko and Franciska Murtić. Early in his childhood, the family moved to Zagreb where Murtić received his education. He attended Craft School 1935–39, studying under Edo Kovačević, Kamilo Tompa and Ernest Tomašević. His first exhibition was held in 1935 at the Royal High School in Zagreb.

In 1939, Murtić enrolled in the Academy of Fine Arts in Zagreb under Ljubo Babić and Krsto Hegedušić. During 1940 he attended classes given by Petar Dobrović in Belgrade returning to Zagreb in 1941 to complete his studies at the academy.

Murtić was strongly influenced by socialist ideas, and at the outbreak of the Second World War he became involved in the anti-fascist movement. In the spring of 1944, Murtić joined the liberation forces, where he worked designing graphics, posters, and books. In the years following the war, Murtić began to travel and exhibit extensively. In 1951 he spent time in the U.S. and Canada, where he encountered the abstract expressionism movement. Back in Zagreb he was one of the founders of the group "March" (Mart) in 1956.

In 1958 Murtić participated in the three biggest events in the world of contemporary art: the Venice Biennale, the Carnegie Prize in Pittsburgh, and Documenta in Kassel.

Murtić's wife was Goranka Vrus Murtić, a well-known artist in her own right. Together they bought and renovated an old stone house in the town of Vrsar, on the Istrian coast. Although their main residence was in Zagreb, they spent much of each year in Vrsar. Of his summer house and studio, Murtić said "It is really nice here, I enjoy the silence and concentration that is irreplaceable... I do not know if I would find a more beautiful place anywhere in the world." The landscape there inspired many of his paintings, especially the "Montraker" cycle, which is named for the nearby Ancient Roman stone quarry.

Edo Murtić was a member of the Yugoslav Academy of Sciences and Arts (now the Croatian Academy of Sciences and Arts) and the Croatian Helsinki Committee for Human Rights. He was named an honorary citizen of the town of Bjelovar.

Edo Murtić died in Zagreb on 2 January 2005, aged 83.

Legacy

Edo Murtić was a prominent representative of abstract painting. Primarily known for painting in oil, and gouache, he also produced a variety of other works such as graphic design, ceramics, mosaics, murals, and theatrical set design.

Murtic's early work was mainly realistic paintings of interiors, portraits and still lifes, and graphical illustrations.

Following the Second World War, a new direction in art was taking place in North America, particularly New York where Abstract Expressionism became a personal expression of the artists' feelings and experiences. At the same time in Paris, Lyrical Abstraction was establishing a new identity. During the 1950s, Murtić experienced both art scenes at first hand. In America he  encountered artists such as  Willem de Kooning and Jackson Pollock, and in Europe he saw the work of Jean René Bazaine, Alfred Manessier, and Gustave Singier. Murtić's own paintings of this time show the influence of these ideas as he developed his own personal style.

Towards the early 1960s, there were signs of Tachisme and Art Informel in his work. His paintings on dark ground were almost monochrome, while those on a light ground showed a rhythmical movement of a dark mass across it. This distinctive theme became his trademark style, with increasingly dynamic strokes with intense, energetic colour.

During the 1970s, Murtić's works began appearing in public areas, such as in the Mirogoj Cemetery in Zagreb, the Memorial in the Čazma Ossuary, the Vatroslav Lisinski Concert Hall, and the Zagrepčanka office building (1975).

By the 1980s, Murtić was internationally recognized as one of the leading abstract painters from the socialist world. In the summer of 1981 he spent months sailing around the southern Adriatic coast. From that experience came his "Fires" (Požari) cycle, a masterful interpretation of the landscape using strong gesture and expressive colour.

The "Eyes of Fear" cycle (1981-4) was stimulated by a new edition of "Jama", a poem by Ivan Goran Kovačić on the horrors of war. Once again committing himself to create the illustrations, Murtić immersed himself in the topic of war, violence, pain and fear. He uses the symbolism of two dark figures from mythology - the Minotaur and the Raven, who are depicted at various times as horse, bull and villain. A threatening atmosphere is created by these figures combined with a stark red and black colour scheme and the tension of his drawing.

The "Montraker" cycle (1992–95) was inspired by the Ancient Roman stone quarry near Vrsar, which became an important motif for Murtić. He was inspired not just by the landscape itself, but its history of being shaped by the hand of man. He portrayed the rocks and the surrounding views with the lights and shadows of different times of day, through the seasons and changing weather, giving a sense of the passage of time both in the landscape, and in himself.

Even in his most abstract work, Murtić remained connected with nature. The shapes of the landscape are expressed by gesture or selection of colour. The line of the hill, rock, or tree are portrayed without  reference to volume, and his palette was based on the colours and lights of the surrounding landscape. Edo Murtić himself said of his paintings that he "drew these colours out of the Istrian landscape" and that it would be possible to talk of "some essence of colour".

In January 2010, an exhibit of Edo Murtić's "War" (Rat) opened at the Art Pavilion in Zagreb. Over 350 of his drawings, gouaches and collages on the subject of death, suffering, horror, and war were on display, presenting a strong humanist and anti-war message. At the opening reception, guests included the President of the Republic of Croatia Ivo Josipović, Prime Minister Jadranka Kosor, Deputy Prime Minister Đurđa Adlešič, Minister of Culture Božo Biškupić, fellow artists, architects, musicians, directors and many others. In his opening remarks, Božo Biškupić called Murtić "one of the greatest Croatian artists of the second half of the 20th century" and one who "pointed the way to the beginning of a new century". The Director of the Art Pavilion, Radovan Vuković described the exhibit as an "exceptional cultural and artistic event", and referring to the large crowd at the opening said "This confirms that  Edo Murtić is not just a name, a symbol of Croatian culture and art of the 20th century, but that five years after his death still excites incredible interest".

The Murtić Foundation (Fundacija Murtić) has been established to ensure that his art will continue to be available for future generations. "The Foundation will contribute to building our national identity" said Ivo Josipović, the  Croatian President, "It deserves a museum because his work is great and very important, and the next generation will certainly want to see it.

Edo Murtić donated over 1,500 of his works to the City of Zagreb, including paintings, sculptures, mosaics, drawings, ceramics and enamels. An exhibit of 300 selected works "From the Murtić Donation" opened in the Museum of Contemporary Art, Zagreb in October 2010. As part of the opening celebrations, the street on the east side of the museum was officially named in his honour.

Works

 Illustrations for "Red Horse" (Crveni konj) by Jure Kaštelan 1940
 Lithographs for "The Pit" (Jama) by Ivan Goran Kovačić. 1944
 Cycle "American Experience" (Dozivlja Amerike) including "Manhattan" (1950), "New York" (1950)
 "Autumn" Jesen  (1962.)
 "Blue screen" Plava podloga  (1964.)
 "Black Triangle" Crni trokut (1968)
 Memorial in Čazma ossuary, 1970s
 Tapestries at the Vatroslav Lisinski Concert Hall 1970s
 Mosaic in the Zagrepčanka building (1975)
 Cycle:  "Entrance to the Garden"( Ulaz u vrt) 1970s
 Cycle: "Great scenery" (Veliki krajolik). 1970s
 "Testament for Epetion" (Zavjet za Epetion) 1984
 Cycle: "Eyes of Fear" (1981–1984)
 Cycle: "Fires" (Požari ) 1985-1990 includes works such as "vineyard" (Vinograd ),  "Cypresses"  Čempresi  (1986.), "Landscape with three suns" Krajolik s tri sunca  (1989.), "Mediterranean Garden" Mediteranski vrt (1990).
 Cycle: "Rat" (War) 1990s

Exhibitions

During his lifetime, Murtić held over 150 solo exhibitions and participated in around 300 group exhibitions on all continents. A selection of the more recent and/or major exhibitions are listed here.

Solo

 2010 "From the Murtić Donation" - Museum of Contemporary Art, Zagreb
 2010 "War" - Art Pavilion in Zagreb
 2009 Art pavilion Juraj Matija Sporer, Opatija
 2005 Art Pavilion in Zagreb
 2004 Kroatische Malerei des 20. Jahrhunderts - Kunsthistorisches Museum Wien, Vienna
 2003 Retrospective Exhibition Modern Gallery, Zagreb
 2003 Lissone near Milan; Palace Harrach in Vienna
 2002 Edo Murtić: Paintings 2001-2001 and Ceramics 2001 - Glyptotheque - Sculpture Museum, Zagreb; Edo Murtić: Novi Manjež Gallery in Moscow
 2000 Museo Revoltella, Trieste
 1998 Museum of Modern Art Dubrovnik, Dubrovnik
 1998 "Montraker" - Art Pavilion in Zagreb
 1966 Gallery of Fine Arts, Split (Galerija Umjetnina), Split

Group
 2009 Da Hartung a Warhol. Presenze internazionali nella collezione Cozzani. Opere dalle raccolte del CAMeC - CAMeC - Centro de Arte Moderna e Contemporanea della Spezia, La Spezia.
 2008 From the holdings of the museum - Museum of Modern Art Dubrovnik, Dubrovnik
 2007 Avangardne tendencije u Hrvatskoj - Galerija Klovićevi dvori, Zagreb
 2007 Sammlung  Politeo - Art Center Berlin Friedrichstrasse, Berlin
 2006 Croatian  Collection - Museum of Contemporary Art Skopje, Skopje
 2004 AVANGUARDIE STORICHE E ASTRAZIONE - Importanti opere su carta del XX secolo - Galleria Torbandena, Trieste
 2003 New Year Art Fair - Galerija Zona, Zagreb
 1999 23rd International Biennial of Graphic Arts - Ljubljana Biennial of Graphic Arts, Ljubljana
 1999 Grands et  Jeunes d`Aujourd Hui 1958-1998 - Museum of Modern Art Dubrovnik, Dubrovnik
 1989 18th International Biennial of Graphic Arts -  Ljubljana
 1958 Venice Bienniale

Galleries/Dealers
 Croatia: Galerija Kaptol, Zagreb
 Germany: 418 Gallery, Munich
 Italy: Galleria  Torbandena, Trieste
 Romania: 418 Gallery, Cetate

Public Collections
 Croatia: City of Zagreb
 Croatia:  Museum of  Modern Art Dubrovnik, Dubrovnik
 Croatia:  Gallery of  Fine Arts / Galerija likovnih umjetnosti, Osijek, Osijek
 Croatia:  MMSU -  Museum of Modern and Contemporary Art Rijeka, Rijeka
 Croatia:  Rovinj  Heritage Museum, Rovinj
 Croatia:  Galerija  Umjetnina Split, Split
 Croatia:  Museum of Contemporary Art, Zagreb  MSU (Muzej  Suvremene Umjetnosti )
 Italy:  CAMeC -  Centro de Arte Moderna e Contemporanea della Spezia, La Spezia
 Macedonia (F.Y.R.M.):  Museum of  Contemporary Art Skopje, Skopje
 Serbia:  Poklon  zbirka Rajka Mamuzića, Novi Sad
 Slovenia:  Galerija  Murska Sobota, Murska  Sobota
 Slovenia:  Mednarodni grafični likovni center, Ljubljana
 United Kingdom:  Tate Gallery, London
 USA:  MoMA - Museum of Modern Art, New York City, NY

Further reading

 Monograph:  Igor Zidić "Edo Murtić" Modern Gallery 2002 
 Murtic: Istra  by Zvonko Makovic ·  307 pages ·  Publisher: Skaner studio (2000) ·    ·  
 Edo Murtic (Biblioteka Likovne monografije = Edition Monograph) Michael Gibson ·  427 pages Publisher: Nacionalna i sveucilisna biblioteka (1989)   Language: English  ASIN: B0006EVUUY
 Murtic (Edizioni d'arte; nuova ser. 10) Edo Murtic 81 pages Publisher: Edizioni Concordia 7 (1978) Language: English ASIN: B0006E3OPI
 Plovidbe atelijerom Ede Murtica (Likovna izdanja) (Croatian Edition) Cedo Prica  175 pages   Publisher: Naprijed (1997)  Language: Croatian      
 Murtić [: HIS LIFE AND ART] Vladimir. Maleković ·  Publisher: Pordenone, Centro Iniziative, 1978. 81 pp., 62 leaves of plates, illus. in color and b/w. In English, Italian and Croatian.   ASIN: B000UDXFJU

Videos about Edo Murtic and his work on the World News website (in Croatian, with footage of the artist and his work)

References

External links

 Edo Murtić - official site

1921 births
2005 deaths
Abstract painters
People from Velika Pisanica
Abstract expressionist artists
Vladimir Nazor Award winners
Members of the Croatian Academy of Sciences and Arts
Academy of Fine Arts, University of Zagreb alumni
Croatian artists
Burials at Mirogoj Cemetery
20th-century Croatian painters
Croatian male painters
Yugoslav painters
20th-century Croatian male artists